Karel Čížek (3 February 1892 – 31 August 1948) was a Czechoslovak rowing coxswain. He competed in the men's eight event at the 1920 Summer Olympics.

References

External links
 

1892 births
1948 deaths
Czech male rowers
Olympic rowers of Czechoslovakia
Rowers at the 1920 Summer Olympics
Coxswains (rowing)
People from Litoměřice District
Sportspeople from the Ústí nad Labem Region